The 2006 Penn Quakers football team represented the University of Pennsylvania in the 2006 NCAA Division I FCS football season. It was the 130th season of play for the Quakers. They were led by 15th-year head coach Al Bagnoli and played their home games at Franklin Field in Philadelphia. The Quakers tied for fourth in the Ivy League. They finished the season 5–5 overall and 3–4 in Ivy League play.

Schedule

References

Penn
Penn Quakers football seasons
Penn Quakers football